Spectre is a novel by William Shatner, co-written with Judith and Garfield Reeves-Stevens, based on the television series Star Trek. The novel was released in 1998 in hardcover format. This is the first in the "Mirror Universe Saga".  The story continues in Dark Victory and Preserver.

Plot

References

External links

1998 Canadian novels
Novels based on Star Trek: The Original Series
Novels based on Star Trek: The Next Generation
Novels by William Shatner
Novels by Judith and Garfield Reeves-Stevens